Ketil Stokkan (born 29 April 1956) is a Norwegian pop artist who has performed as solo artist as well as the singer in the Norwegian band Zoo. 

Stokkan was born in Harstad. In 1983 he participated in the Norwegian qualifying heat for Eurovision with the song "Samme charmeur" which was placed second. In 1986 he won the national Melodi Grand Prix with the song "Romeo", written by himself, which came 12th on homeground in the Eurovision Song Contest final, which that year was held in Bergen, Norway. In 1990 he won the national final again with the song "Brandenburger Tor", the song ended up last tied with Finland. Stokkan now works as a school teacher in Nordkjosbotn, Balsfjord.

Stokkan is also an outspoken Odd Fellow.

Stokkan also participated in Melodi Grand Prix 2021 with the song "My Life Is OK".

Discography

Zoo
1978 – Captured in Zoo
1978 – Guilty
1979 – Noregs heitaste
1980 – Z på maken
1981 – Gaya
1982 – Shagalai
1994 – Zoobra
2000 – Evig ung

Solo
1983 – Samme charmeur (single)
1984 – Gentlemen's agreement
1985 – Ekte mannfolk
1986 – Romeo
1988 – Øyan dine (single)
1989 – Nexus – Back to my roots (single)
1990 – Stokkan Band – Brandenburger Tor (single)
1991 – Stokkan Band – Beina på jorda (single)
1994 – Stokkan – To the bone
1996 – All that blues from Norway (Samle-CD/Div. Art.)
1998 – Æ e` Nordlending (Samle-CD/Din NN-Art)
2001 – Evig Ung. Gamlegutta i ZOO aktive igjen med samle-CD

References

1956 births
Living people
Eurovision Song Contest entrants for Norway
Eurovision Song Contest entrants of 1986
Eurovision Song Contest entrants of 1990
Norwegian male singers
Norwegian pop musicians
Musicians from Harstad
Melodi Grand Prix contestants
Melodi Grand Prix winners
Norwegian schoolteachers